The 2019 Internazionali di Tennis Città dell'Aquila, also known for sponsorship reasons as the 2019 Aterno Gas & Power Tennis Cup, was a professional tennis tournament played on clay courts. It was the 13th edition of the men's tournament which was part of the 2019 ATP Challenger Tour. The event took place in L'Aquila, Italy between 19 – 25 August 2019.

Singles main draw entrants

Seeds 

 1 Rankings as of 12 August 2019.

Other entrants 
The following players received wildcards into the singles main draw:
  Carlos Alcaraz
  Gianluca Di Nicola
  Francesco Forti
  Luca Pancaldi
  Máté Valkusz

The following player received entry into the singles main draw as an alternate:
  Ante Pavić

The following players received entry into the singles main draw using their ITF World Tennis Ranking:
  Francisco Cerúndolo
  Juan Pablo Ficovich
  Tom Jomby
  Christopher O'Connell
  Dmitry Popko

The following players received entry from the qualifying draw:
  Cristian Rodríguez
  Andrea Vavassori

Champions

Singles 

  Andrea Collarini def.  Andrej Martin 6–3, 6–1.

Doubles 

  Tomislav Brkić /  Ante Pavić def.  Luca Margaroli /  Andrea Vavassori 6–3, 6–2.

References

External links
 Official website

Internazionali di Tennis Città dell'Aquila
2019
2019 in Italian tennis
August 2019 sports events in Italy